The 2022 Maidstone Borough Council election took place on 5 May 2022, in order to elect 18 out of 55 members to the Maidstone Borough Council. These set of seats were last up for election in 2018. Members elected in this election will have their seats next up for election in 2024, due to the council opting for a four-year cycle of elections instead of the current format from 2024 onwards.

As the results were declared, the Conservative Party initially lost their majority on the council:

After the result was declared, but before the first post-election meeting of the council, independent councillor Nick de Wiggondene-Sheppard rejoined the Conservatives (having been elected as a Conservative in 2019 but subsequently left the party). This meant that the Conservatives managed to retain a one seat majority on the council at the annual council meeting on 21 May 2022, retaining control of the authority.

Results summary

Ward results

Allington

Bearsted

Boxley

Bridge

Coxheath and Hunton

East

Fant

Harrietsham and Lenham

Headcorn

Heath

High Street

Marden and Yalding

North

Park Wood

Shepway North

Shepway South

South

Staplehurst

References

Maidstone
Maidstone Borough Council elections